Charles Shaw Lefevre (20 September 1759 – 27 April 1823), born Charles Shaw, was a British Whig politician.

Shaw Lefevre was the son of Reverend George Shaw, Rector of Womersley, Yorkshire, by his wife Mary, daughter of Edward Green. He was called to the Bar, Lincoln's Inn. He sat as Member of Parliament for Newtown (Isle of Wight) from 1796 to 1802 and for Reading from 1802 to 1820. He was elected a Fellow of the Royal Society in November 1796.

He married Helena, daughter of John Lefevre, in 1789, and in a common practice of the time, merged their surnames, becoming Shaw Lefevre. They lived at Heckfield Place in Hampshire and their children included Charles Shaw Lefevre, 1st Viscount Eversley, Speaker of the House of Commons, and Sir John Shaw Lefevre. Shaw Lefevre died in April 1823, aged 63. His wife survived him by eleven years and died in August 1834.

References

1759 births
1823 deaths
Whig (British political party) MPs
British MPs 1796–1800
UK MPs 1801–1802
UK MPs 1802–1806
UK MPs 1806–1807
Fellows of the Royal Society
People from Hart District
Members of the Parliament of Great Britain for Newtown
Members of the Parliament of the United Kingdom for Newtown
Members of the Parliament of the United Kingdom for Reading
People from Selby District